Race to the top may refer to:

 race to the top (phrase), contrary to race to the bottom, one of the two effects of regulatory competition
 Race to the Top, a US government program